The Faculty of Linguistics, Philology & Phonetics is a department of the University of Oxford, headed by Aditi Lahiri. It was created in 2008, uniting the discipline which had previously been studied across a variety of other departments. The faculty is based at the Centre for Linguistics & Philology in the Clarendon Institute building on Walton Street, between Worcester College and Little Clarendon Street. It is part of Oxford's Humanities Division.

Research
Research is currently in the following areas:

Phonology
Psycholinguistics and neurolinguistics
Romance linguistics
Semantics
Syntax
Philology
Phonetics

References

Departments of the University of Oxford
Educational institutions established in 2008
2008 establishments in England